Jeyhunabad (also Romanized as Jeyḩūnābād; also known as Jehūnābād) is a village in Dinavar Rural District, Dinavar District, Sahneh County, Kermanshah Province, Iran. At the 2006 census, its population was 1,076, in 297 families.

Famous mystics from Jeyhunabad: Malek Jân Ne’mati, Nur Ali Elahi, Hajj Nematollah.

References 

Populated places in Sahneh County